Hoddlesden is a village in Blackburn with Darwen, Lancashire, England.  It contains five buildings that are recorded in the National Heritage List for England as designated listed buildings, all of which are listed at Grade II.  This grade is the lowest of the three gradings given to listed buildings and is applied to "buildings of national importance and special interest".  Three of the listed buildings are dwellings and a war memorial in the village, and the other is a farmhouse in the surrounding countryside.

Buildings

References

Citations

Sources

Buildings and structures in Blackburn with Darwen
Lists of listed buildings in Lancashire